A feddan is a unit of area used in Egypt, South Sudan, Sudan, Syria, and the Oman. In Classical Arabic, the word means 'a yoke of oxen', implying the area of ground that could be tilled by oxen in a certain time. In Egypt, the feddan is the only non-metric unit which remained in use following the adoption of the metric system. A feddan is divided into 24 kirat (qīrāt), with one kirat equals 175 square metres.

Equivalent units
1 feddan = 24 kirat = 60 metre × 70 metre = 4200 square metres (m²) = 0.420 hectares = 1.037 acres

In Syria, the feddan ranges from 2295 square metres (m²) to 3443 square metres (m²).

See also
Acre
Dunam

References

Units of area
Science and technology in Egypt